Xaa-Pro aminopeptidase 1 is an enzyme that in humans is encoded by the XPNPEP1 gene.

Function 

X-prolyl aminopeptidase (EC 3.4.11.9) is a proline-specific metalloaminopeptidase that specifically catalyzes the removal of any unsubstituted N-terminal amino acid that is adjacent to a penultimate proline residue. Because of its specificity toward proline, it has been suggested that X-prolyl aminopeptidase is important in the maturation and degradation of peptide hormones, neuropeptides, and tachykinins, as well as in the digestion of otherwise resistant dietary protein fragments, thereby complementing the pancreatic peptidases. Deficiency of X-prolyl aminopeptidase results in excretion of large amounts of imino-oligopeptides in urine (Blau et al., 1988).[supplied by OMIM]

Model organisms 

Model organisms have been used in the study of XPNPEP1 function. A conditional knockout mouse line called Xpnpep1tm1a(KOMP)Wtsi was generated at the Wellcome Trust Sanger Institute. Male and female animals underwent a standardized phenotypic screen to determine the effects of deletion. Additional screens performed:  - In-depth immunological phenotyping - in-depth bone and cartilage phenotyping

References

Further reading